Paul T. Finger, MD, FACS, is an ophthalmologist in New York, New York, specializing in ocular oncology (ocular tumors, orbital disease and ophthalmic radiation therapy). Finger is a Clinical Professor of Ophthalmology at the New York University School of Medicine in New York City, New York. He is also the director of The New York Eye Cancer Center and Ocular Tumor Services at The New York Eye and Ear Infirmary of Mt. Sinai. He consults for Northwell Health Complex of affiliated Hospitals including Manhattan Eye, Ear and Throat Hospital and NYU School of Medicine. He is Chair of the Ophthalmic Oncology Task Force for the American Joint Committee on Cancer (AJCC), wrote the eye cancer staging systems section for the Union International for Cancer Control (UICC). As Chair, he brought together an OOTF to develop consensus eye plaque radiation guidelines for The American Brachytherapy Society - American Association of Physicists in Medicine. Dr. Finger was the first the only ophthalmologist asked to serve on the 2012 American Association of Physicists in Medicine’s Task Group-129 that produced both dosimetry and quality assurance standards for plaque brachytherapy. As of 2021, Dr. Finger has authored over 335 peer-review scientific articles, 2 books, 54 book chapters and 2 web sites (https://eyecancer.com and https://eyecancercure.com).

Dr.Finger earned his BS and MD from Tulane University, his internship at NYC's St. Vincent’s Medical Center, ophthalmology residency at The Manhattan Eye, Ear and Throat Hospital, and a fellowship in ocular tumor, orbital disease and ophthalmic radiation therapy with Samuel Packer, MD (inventor of iodine-125 plaque brachytherapy).

Dr. Finger is a life Fellow of the American Academy of Ophthalmology, Chair of the American Joint Committee on Cancer, member of the Commission on Cancer, Retina Society, American Society of Retinal Specialists, International Council of Ophthalmology, Union for International Cancer Control, International Society of Ophthalmic Oncology and the American Society for Radiation Oncology. 

Dr. Finger is Founder and Chairman of The Eye Cancer Foundation, whose purpose is to develop and encourage international, multi-center research on new diagnostic treatments; to provide much-needed support services for patients and their families; and to save lives through an international fellowship program by training doctors in underserved and unserved countries.(http://eyecancercure.com) The foundation has provided fellowship education support to enable over 50 eye cancer specialists to return and practice in their unserved or underserved countries.

Consultant or Advisory Board: Finger is the president and chief executive officer of LV Liberty Vision Corporation (http://libertyvision.com).

Education
Finger received his medical doctorate from Tulane Medical School in 1982. He completed his residency at Manhattan Eye, Ear and Throat Hospital, and his fellowship in ocular tumor, orbital disease and ophthalmic radiation therapy with Samuel Packer MD at North Shore Hospital - Cornell University Medical College in Manhasset, New York.

In 1995, Dr. Finger established The New York Eye Cancer Center on the upper east side of New York City, US, where he sees private patients.

Career
Finger is certified by the American Board of Ophthalmology and is a Fellow of both the American College of Surgeons and the American Academy of Ophthalmology. He was asked to chair the Ophthalmic Oncology Task Force for the American Joint Committee on Cancer for the 7th and 8th editions. Finger was asked to write the chapters on eye cancer staging for the UICC. He was also asked to write the Intraocular Melanoma Chapter for the widely used medical textbook, Cancer, edited by DeVita, Hellman and Rosenberg.

His research has focused on melanoma of the choroid, ciliary body and iris. He has written extensively about new ways to detect and treat retinoblastoma, conjunctival melanoma, squamous carcinoma, metastatic cancer to the eye and orbital tumors.

He has helped produce multiple medical textbooks and chapters on eye cancer.

Prevention campaign
Under the slogan, "Think of sunglasses as sunblock for your eyes", Finger has campaigned on television to increase the use of sunglasses in order to prevent eye cancers before they happen.

See also
Eye Cancer

References

External links
eyecancer.com, eye cancer information
Dr. Finger's private practice website
Dr. Finger's favorite charity

American ophthalmologists
Living people
Physicians from New York City
American inventors
1955 births
Tulane University School of Medicine alumni
New York University Grossman School of Medicine faculty